The Steve Harvey Show is an American television sitcom that aired on The WB from August 25, 1996, to February 17, 2002. It was created by Winifred Hervey and directed by Stan Lathan.

Synopsis
Steve Hightower (Steve Harvey) is a 1970s funk legend who is now a music teacher/vice principal at Booker T. Washington High School on Chicago's West Side. Budget cutbacks meant Steve also had to teach drama and art, much to his surprise. Cedric Robinson (Cedric the Entertainer) is a coach at the high school, and Steve's longtime best friend. The principal of Booker T. Washington High is Steve's former classmate, Regina Grier (Wendy Raquel Robinson), whom Steve affectionately calls "Piggy", because she was overweight in childhood.

Steve forms a strong bond with two of his students: Romeo Santana (Merlin Santana), a stylish, self-absorbed ladies' man, and the equally vacuous Stanley Kuznocki, nicknamed Bullethead (William Lee Scott) - acting as their mentor, and gradually, accepts them as friends.

In season 2, the show introduced a new character, a secretary named Lovita Jenkins (Terri J. Vaughn), a woman who is fundamentally in the good mood, but nonetheless, considerably unrefined in terms of disposition. Cedric and Lovita begin dating, and eventually marry and gave birth to a child. The show also featured a succession of young actresses who served as female foils to Romeo and Bullethead; the longest-lasting of these was Lori Beth Denberg as the overachieving, socially inept Lydia Gutman. Rapper The Lady of Rage also had a recurring role as Coretta "The Ox" Cox, a physically massive, brutish teenage girl in romantic pursuit of Romeo. Coretta would call Bullethead a "broke Brad Pitt" whenever he annoyed her, but would usually refer to Lydia as "Linda", "Lisa", or "Lucy" (correctly calling her "Lydia" only once).

Steve was part of a fictional music group called "Steve Hightower and the High Tops," who would temporarily reunite to perform on occasion. The members consisted of Steve, T-Bone (played by T. K. Carter, later by Don 'D.C.' Curry), Pretty Tony (played by Ronald Isley of the Isley Brothers), and Clyde (played by Jonathan Slocumb). Two of their signature songs (performed several times on the show) were "When the Funk Hits the Fan" (and later on Harvey's eponymous talk show), and "Break Me Off a Piece of That Funk." Though Cedric was not an original member of the group, he usually sang with them on several events.

Minor recurring characters throughout the series included Cedric's grandmother named "Grandma Puddin'" (played by Cedric the Entertainer) and Regina's boyfriend, former NFL star Warrington Steele (played by Dorien Wilson). Kenan Thompson and Kel Mitchell appeared in several episodes as "Junior" and "Vincent" (which "All That" cast member Lori Beth Denberg starred in). Wayne Wilderson played Byron, a "bougie" type character who was a television producer and a member of the Onyx Club (a professional men's group that Steve and Cedric tried to join). Dwayne Adway played Jordan Maddox, a professional basketball player who was briefly married to Regina before dying during their honeymoon. Ernest Lee Thomas made a few appearances as the Reverend who eulogized Maddox, and who married Cedric and Lovita.

Episodes

Cast

Main
 Steve Harvey as Steven "Steve" Hightower
 Cedric the Entertainer as Cedric Jackie Robinson
 Merlin Santana as Romeo Santana
 William Lee Scott as Stanley "Bullethead" Kuznocki
 Wendy Raquel Robinson as Principal Regina Grier-Maddox
 Tracy Vilar as Sophia Ortiz (season 1)
 Netfa Perry as Sara (season 1)
 Ariyan A. Johnson as Aisha (season 2)
 Terri J. Vaughn as Lovita Alizay Jenkins-Robinson (seasons 2–6)
 Lori Beth Denberg as Lydia Liza Guttman (seasons 4–6; recurring season 3)

Recurring
 Kel Mitchell as Vincent (1996–1998)
 Kenan Thompson as Junior (1996–1998)
 T. K. Carter as T-Bone (1996–1998)
 Ronald Isley as Pretty Tony (1996–2001)
 Jonathan Slocumb as Clyde (1996–2001)
 Ariyan A. Johnson as Aisha (1997–1998)
 The Lady of Rage as Coretta "The Ox" Cox (1997–2000; credited during season 4 episodes as "Robin Yvette")
 Wayne Wilderson as Byron (1998–2001)
 Dorien Wilson as Warrington Steele (1997–1998)
 Samm Levine as Arthur Rabinowitz (2001)
 Don "D.C." Curry as T-Bone (2001)
 Dwayne Adway as Jordan Maddox (2000)

Special guest appearances
 Marissa Jaret Winokur
 Teena Marie
 Meagan Good
 Jerry Springer
 Bow Wow
 Jermaine Dupri
 Teddy Riley
 Snoop Dogg
 Sean Combs
 Kim Fields
 Isabel Sanford
 Judge Greg Mathis
 Antonio Fargas
 Busta Rhymes
 Brian McKnight
 Nikki Cox
 Boris Kodjoe
 Gabrielle Union
 Bumper Robinson
 Adrian Zmed
 Jennifer Lyons
 Ja'net Dubois
 Megalyn Echikunwoke

Running gags

There were a few recurrent gags throughout the series. For instance, Lovita had several relatives named after products or items (her brother's name was Duracell; she had cousins named "Kinko", "Bruschetta," "Clinique," and "Camay").

Steve also made several references to his popular hot spot "The Nasty Kitty" and his favorite working girl, Bubblicious, even though the strip club is never seen. Steve's topical humor of popular culture was also another recurring gag. One example of these puns: "When I see that woman, I'm like Shaq doing Shakespeare - I just don't know how to act!". Another recurring gag on the show was despite being a one-time famous musician in the universe of the show, Steve was always mistaken for being other famous musicians. For example, in an episode guest starring Jerry Springer, he refers to him as "That Cop from the Village People." Another episode featured singer Teena Marie, who when Steve went to introduce himself to see if she'd remember him, answers "Oh yes! Lionel! How are you? Give my best to the rest of The Commodores" (referring to her Motown labelmate Lionel Richie).

Occasional gags referenced Bullethead's trailer park lifestyle, and Romeo's full name (he has used his full name Romeo Miguel Jesus Pele Rojas Alejandro Santana). In one episode, he wrote all of his names on paper but not prepared his assignment, resulting in an "F". Lydia almost always displayed an obsession for her classmate (and alleged lover), Arthur Rabinowitz (whom Steve referred to as "that polite Jewish boy that does his taxes"), and for her favorite entertainer, Barbra Streisand; however, she had total disdain for classmates "Heather the cheerleader" and "Jennifer the cheerleader". One other gag was that teachers would explain to a student (amongst themselves) because of a condition or appearance ("Helmet Boy" for wearing a special helmet in gym class; "Au Natural Girl" for having a strong body odor, and "Firestarter" for one kid who kept setting items on fire).

Seasonal ratings in the United States

Series end
In 2001, Harvey decided to pursue other projects. He wished to end the show after the fifth season, but at the insistence of the WB network, reluctantly filmed a 13-episode sixth season.

The series ended with Regina mulling over a job offer to be a principal at a private school in California. Steve, who refused to go with Regina, acts supportive despite his feelings. Regina ends up taking the job; with encouragement from Lydia, Bullethead, and Romeo, Steve decides to go after her to reveal his true feelings. Lydia, Romeo, and Bullethead have all graduated by the series' finale. Meanwhile, Cedric and Lovita win the lottery and Lovita goes into labor (Terri J. Vaughn's real-life pregnancy was written into the show that season).

Syndication
The series was first distributed to syndication to The WB, Fox, UPN, and independent affiliates in the United States by Columbia TriStar Television Distribution in September 2001, and remained airing in broadcast syndication in some U.S. markets on various local stations (such as WCIU and MeTV in Chicago) as late as 2008. From 2001 to 2005, reruns aired on New York's UPN station, WWOR-TV. From 2014 to June 2016, after Bill Cosby's sexual harassment allegations, The Cosby Show reruns were replaced on WPIX by reruns of The Steve Harvey Show. The show has started airing again in syndication as of 2015.

The series aired on BET until March 2009, and was on TBS in the United States until September 24, 2011, UK Channel Trouble. It was broadcast on Ion Television until March 16, 2009.

As of 2019, reruns of the show can be seen on BET Her and getTV.

, the series is currently available for streaming online on Pluto TV and Tubi and Amazon Prime in the United States and the CTV Television Network's streaming service, CTV Throwback in Canada.

In 2022, Sony Pictures' channel Throw Back TV  on YouTube posted several clips and episodes from the series for streaming purposes, led to the show's distributor Sony Pictures Television launched the channel dedicated to the series on August 24, 2022.

Home media
In 2003, Columbia TriStar Home Entertainment released The Best of the Steve Harvey Show, Vol. 1, on Region 1 DVD. The disc features five episodes of the series.

Awards and nominations

See also
 Steve Harvey
 List of The Steve Harvey Show episodes
 List of Award Nominations received by The Steve Harvey Show
 The Steve Harvey Morning Show

References

External links
 
 

1996 American television series debuts
2002 American television series endings
1990s American black sitcoms
2000s American black sitcoms
1990s American high school television series
2000s American high school television series
1990s American sitcoms
2000s American sitcoms
1990s American workplace comedy television series
2000s American workplace comedy television series
English-language television shows
Television series by Sony Pictures Television
Television series by Universal Television
Television shows set in Chicago
The WB original programming
Television series by Brad Grey Television
Television series about educators